is a 1999 Japanese film directed by Katsuhito Ishii and starring Tadanobu Asano. It is based on a manga of the same name by Minetaro Mochizuki which was originally serialized in Mister Magazine circa 1993 under the title "Daisharin" (Big Wheel). The current title was adopted when the comic was published as its own book.

Plot
Kuroo Samehada (Tadanobu Asano), a yakuza soldier, is on the run for his life after stealing from his boss Tanuki Fukuda (Ittoku Kishibe). During a chase through a forest, Tanuki's car is struck by a SUV. Enter Toshiko Momojiri (Shie Kohinata), who is also on the run. She is trying to escape her twisted uncle Michio Sonezaki (Yohachi Shimida), who manages the hotel where she works and who has developed a controlling sexual obsession with her. During the crash Toshiko is knocked unconscious, and Samehada is able to escape with Toshiko in tow.

The couple are then chased across Japan by a large cast of gun crazy, deadpan gang members dressed in over-the-top, high-end fashion. They are also being followed by Yamada, an amateur hit man, who was hired by Michio to bring Toshiko back.

Cast
Tadanobu Asano as Kuroo Samehada
Shie Kohinata as Toshiko Momojiri
Ittoku Kishibe as Tanuki Fukuda
Susumu Terajima as Sawada
Kimie Shingyoji as Mitsuko Fukuda
Youhachi Shimada as Michio Sonezaki
Tatsuya Gashuin as Yamada
Shingo Tsurumi as Mitsuru Fukuda

The Yakuza hitmen
Daigaku Sekine as Sakaguchi
Koh Takasugi as Sorimachi
Shingoro Yamada as Taniguchi
Hitoshi Kiyokawa as Maruo
Yoji Tanaka as Asahina
Keisuke Horibe as Inuzuka
Yoshiyuki Morishita as Hidari
Kanji Tsuda as Fukazume

Release
The film was shown at the 1998 Toronto International Film Festival.

Bibliography

References

External links 
 

1998 films
Live-action films based on manga
Japanese action films
Yakuza films
Films directed by Katsuhito Ishii
1990s action films
Japanese crime comedy films
1990s Japanese films